Ramyal is a small village in Lower Dir District, Malakand region of Khyber-Pakhtunkhwa, Pakistan. Ramyal is located to on the west of Chakdara. The village is 3 km away from Chakdara city, which is located near Churchill Piquet on the bank of the Swat River. The population of Ramyal is about 2,000 and consists of primarily of Pashtun speaking the Pashto language.

Populated places in Lower Dir District